Hussain Al-Nowaiqi (born 3 December 1995) is a Saudi Arabian professional footballer who plays as a right-back for Saudi Pro League side Al-Khaleej.

Career 
Al-Nowaiqi started his career at Al-Khaleej's youth team. He made his debut during the 2017–18 season, he made 13 appearances in his debut season. On 20 July 2019, Al-Nowaiqi renewed his contract with Al-Khaleej. On 28 January 2020, Al-Nowaiqi scored his first goal for the club in the 2–1 win against Al-Jabalain. During the 2021–22 season, Al-Nowaiqi made 33 appearances and scored twice helping Al-Khaleej win the 2021–22 First Division. On 4 July 2022, Al-Nowaiqi renewed his contract with Al-Khaleej following their promotion to the Pro League. On 25 August 2022, Al-Nowaiqi made his Pro League debut in a 2–0 loss to Al-Hilal.

Honours
Al-Khaleej 
First Division: 2021–22

References

External links 
 

1995 births
Living people
Association football fullbacks
Saudi Arabian footballers
Saudi First Division League players
Saudi Professional League players
Khaleej FC players